The National Capital Junior Hockey League (NCJHL) is a Junior ice hockey league in Ontario, Canada, sanctioned by the Hockey Eastern Ontario and Hockey Canada. The league is meant to be an interprovincial league between Ontario and Quebec.

History
From 1968 until 2010, the league was known as the Eastern Ontario Junior C Hockey League. At the start of the 2010-2011 regular season, the league was rebranded under its new name - National Capital Junior Hockey League (NCJHL).

In April 2015, the NCJHL accepted the application of the Morrisburg Lions to join the league for starting in the 2015-2016 season.  The Lions were one of six teams dropped when the Eastern Ontario Junior Hockey League re-configured and re-branded as the Central Canada Hockey League Tier 2.

In March 2017, it was announced that the reigning NCJHL champions, Embrun Panthers, were joining CCHL Tier 2 in the fall of 2017.

In April 2017, four new teams have been accepted to join the NCJHL: two brand new teams - Blackburn Inferno and Bytown Royals; and two former CCHL Tier 2 teams - Metcalfe Jets and South Grenville Rangers, bringing the total to 12 teams.

In July 2017, the Rockland Nationals became the Les Castors de Clarence (Clarence Castors) after originally moving to Clarence to become the Jr. C version of the CCHL's Rockland Nationals. The CCHL2 Clarence Castors moved to Carleton Place to serve as an affiliation to the Carleton Place Canadians, calling themselves the Carleton Place Jr. Canadians.

The 2019-2020 season was suspended due to the Covid-19 pandemic, before resuming in 2021 (although with the Inferno relocated to Almonte.)

Current teams

On hiatus

John A. Cameron Trophy League Champions

Former teams
Alexandria Glens
Blackburn Inferno 2017-2018 expansion team from Blackburn Hamlet re-located to Carp 2018 and eventually Almonte in 2021.
Char-Lan Rebels
Casselman Stars
Embrun Panthers (1972-2017) - join the CCHL2
Cornwall Township Flyers
Long Sault Vipers
Outaouais Jr. Académie
Papineau Vikings 1998-2018. relocated to Stittsville as Valley Golden Knights
Russell Lions
North Stormont Express
Maxville Mustangs

References

External links
Website

C
C
1972 establishments in Ontario
Sports leagues established in 1972
Hockey Eastern Ontario